The Cotagaita River is a river of Bolivia in the Potosí Department, Nor Chichas Province, Cotagaita Municipality. It is a right affluent of Tumusla River and belongs to the Pillku Mayu river basin..

See also
List of rivers of Bolivia

References
Rand McNally, The New International Atlas, 1993.

Rivers of Potosí Department